Manly Tram Depot was part of the Sydney tram network.

History

Manly Depot served the isolated Manly lines. It opened in 1903, being rebuilt in 1911 for electric trams. It closed as a tram depot, along with the network on 30 September 1939. The shed continued to be used as a bus depot, and in 1947 the remaining steam tram sheds were demolished, while the electric tram sheds were modified for use as a bus depot and subsequently adapted for commercial use being a car dealership and later retail markets.

Design
The depot had a steel frame with a saw tooth roof covering five roads with the tramcars having to enter the new shed through the old steam tram sheds, which were timber framed and clad in corrugated iron. Design included:

5 tracks
Curtailed parapet
East facade altered, north and south elevations reclad
Roof orientation to south
Traffic Office building at the East end of the property

Operations
The depot served the isolated Manly lines with services to Harbord, Narrabeen and The Spit.

Gallery

References

Demolished buildings and structures in Sydney
Industrial buildings in Sydney
Manly, New South Wales
Tram depots in Sydney
Transport infrastructure completed in 1903